Milburn is a surname. Its origin is English (Northumbria and Cumbria), and it is a habitational name from a place in Cumbria, named in Old English as 'millstream', from mylen 'mill' and burna 'stream'.

Notable people
 Alan Milburn, UK politician
 Amos Milburn, American rhythm and blues singer
 Barry Milburn, New Zealand cricketer
 Colin Milburn, English Test match cricketer
 Darren Milburn, Australian rules footballer
 George Milburn, English footballer
 Glyn Milburn, American football player
 Jack Milburn (footballer born 1908), footballer who played for Leeds United
 Jackie Milburn, Newcastle United F.C. and England footballer
 Jackie Milburn (footballer born 1921), footballer who played for Crook Town and Willington
 Jeff Milburn, American professional driver and racing team owner
 Jim Milburn, English footballer
 Joel Milburn, Australian Olympic 400 metres sprinter
 Martina Milburn, Chief Executive of the Prince's Trust
 Oliver Milburn, English actor
 Richard Milburn, American composer
 Richard M. Milburn, American politician
 Rod Milburn, American hurdler
 Rowan Milburn, New Zealand cricketer
 Stuart Milburn, English cricketer

See also
Milburn (given name)

References

Surnames
Surnames of English origin
English toponymic surnames